Coast Guard Station Sturgeon Bay is a United States Coast Guard station located on Lake Michigan and the Sturgeon Bay Ship Canal in the Town of Sturgeon Bay in Door County, Wisconsin, just outside the city of Sturgeon Bay. The Sturgeon Bay Canal Light is located within the limits of the station. Duties of the station include search and rescue, law enforcement and ice rescue missions during the winter months.

Station Sturgeon Bay is in District 9 and it is a sub-unit of Sector Lake Michigan.

Gallery

References

External links
Station Homepage
Station Overview

Buildings and structures in Door County, Wisconsin
Military installations in Wisconsin
United States Coast Guard stations